Wanderer, Wanderers, or The Wanderer may refer to:
 Nomadic and/or itinerant people, working short-term before moving to other locations, who wander from place to place with no permanent home, or are vagrant
 The Wanderer, an alternate name for the Wandering Jew

Books

Novels
 The Wanderer (Burney novel), an 1814 novel by Frances Burney
 The Wanderer (Creech novel), 2000 novel by Sharon Creech
 The Wanderer (Edwards novel), a 1953 children's novel by Monica Edwards
 The Wanderer (Leiber novel), a 1964 novel by Fritz Leiber
 The Wanderers (Price novel), a 1974 novel by Richard Price
 The Wanderers (Rimland novel), a 1977 novel by Ingrid Rimland
 The Wanderers (Shishkov novel), a 1931 novel by Vyacheslav Shishkov
 The Wanderer (Gibran book), a book by Kahlil Gibran
 The Wanderer (Waltari novel), a 1949 novel by Mika Waltari
 The Wanderer or Le Grand Meaulnes, a 1913 novel by Alain-Fournier
 The Wanderers, a 2017 novel by Meg Howrey
 Wanderer, a 1985 science fiction novel by Dennis Schmidt
 Wanderers, a 2019 dystopian science fiction novel by Chuck Wendig

Poems 
 "The Wanderer" (Old English poem), an Old English poem
 "The Wanderer", a 1726 poem by Richard Savage
 "The Wanderer" (Maykov poem), a poem by Apollon Maykov published in 1867
 "The Wanderer", a poem by John Masefield (1878–1967)
"The Wanderer", a 1913 poem by Christopher Brennan 
 "The Wanderer", a 1921 poem by Henry Lane Eno

Periodicals
 Wanderers (comics), a DC Comics publication
 The Wanderer (manga), by Narumi Kakinouchi
 The Wanderer (Massachusetts newspaper), a weekly newspaper in southeastern Massachusetts
 The Wanderer (Roman Catholic newspaper), a Catholic national weekly based in Minnesota

Film and television 
 The Wanderer (1913 film), silent film
 The Wanderer (1925 film), silent film directed by Raoul Walsh, starring Greta Nissen and Wallace Beery
 The Wanderers (1956 film), a 1956 Italian drama film directed by Hugo Fregonese and starring Peter Ustinov
 The Wanderer (1967 film), French film
 The Wanderers (1973 film)
 The Wanderers (1979 film), film directed by Philip Kaufman
 Wanderers (2014 film), a 2014 Swedish science fiction short film directed by Erik Wernquist
 The Wanderer (TV series), a 1994 British television series starring Bryan Brown
 The Wanderer (audio drama), 2012
 The Wanderer, a character in Canadian television series Lost Girl
 Wanderer, a male mallard duck who was Greenie's father in Leafie, A Hen into the Wild

Music

Albums
 The Wanderer (Holy Blood album), 2002
 The Wanderer (O.A.R. album), 1997
 The Wanderer (Kevin Rowland album), 1988
 The Wanderer (Donna Summer album), 1980
 The Wanderer, a 2001 album by Karunesh
 Wanderer, a 2011 Celtic relaxing album by Adrian von Ziegler
 Wanderer (Heaven Shall Burn album), 2016
 Wanderer (Cara Dillon album), 2017
 Wanderer (Cat Power album), 2018
 Wanderers (Visions of Atlantis album, 2019

Classical
 Der Wanderer (D 489), an 1816 song by Franz Schubert
 "Der Wanderer", a song by Robert Schumann
 "Der Wanderer", a song by Pascal Dusapin based on a poem by Friedrich Nietzsche
 "Der Wanderer", a song by Anselm Hüttenbrenner
 "Der Wanderer", pour choeur d'hommes et piano, by Philippe Hersant
 Wanderer Fantasy, a fantasy for piano by Franz Schubert
 The Wanderer, the god Wotan in Wagner's opera Siegfried
 "The Wanderer" or "Po dikim stepyam Zabaikalya", a Russian folk song
 The Wanderer, a 2005 piece for a cappella voices by Ezequiel Viñao
The Wanderer, Russian song by Modest Mussorgsky
The Wanderer, song by Cecil Armstrong Gibbs

Pop songs
 "The Wanderer" (Dion song), a 1961 song by Dion covered by many other artists
 "The Wanderer" (Donna Summer song), a 1980 song on her album of the same name
 "The Wanderer" (U2 song), a 1993 song by U2 with lead vocals by Johnny Cash
 "The Wanderer", song by Emperor from their 1997 album Anthems to the Welkin at Dusk
 "Wanderer", 2007 song by the band Ensiferum on the album Victory Songs Song
 "Wanderer", a song from the 2016 album Jomsviking by Amon Amarth
 "The Wanderer", a song from the 2019 album Philosophers, Poets & Kings by Kate Rusby
 "The Happy Wanderer", the English title of a post-World War II German song

Ships 
 HMS Wanderer, several ships of the British Royal Navy
 USS Wanderer, several United States Navy ships
 Wanderer (sailing dinghy), a 14-foot sailing dinghy designed by Ian Proctor
 Wanderer (slave ship), a ship that illegally carried more than 500 slaves from the Congo and Angola to Savannah, Georgia in 1858
 Pearson Wanderer, a 30-foot sailboat designed by Bill Shaw
 Wanderer (1878), a steam yacht which later became HMS Sealark
 Wanderer (1879), the last whaling ship built in Mattapoisett, Massachusetts, for which The Wanderer (Massachusetts newspaper) was named
 Wanderer (1891), a four-masted steel barque which inspired John Masefield's poem of the same name
 Wanderer (1893), a San Francisco pilot boat bought by Sterling Hayden and used for his voyage to Tahiti
 Wanderer, a 16-foot Wayfarer dinghy sailed by travel writer Frank Dye

Sports

Venues
 Old Wanderers, a cricket ground in Johannesburg, South Africa
 Sharjah Wanderers, a sports club and grounds in Sharjah, United Arab Emirates
 Wanderers Cricket Ground Windhoek, Namibia
 Wanderers Grounds, a playing ground in Halifax, Nova Scotia, Canada
 Wanderers Stadium, a cricket ground in Johannesburg, South Africa

Teams

Australia
 Wanderers Football Club, Marrara, Northern Territory
 Western Sydney Wanderers FC,
 Western Sydney Wanderers FC (W-League)

Canada
 Ajax Wanderers R.U.F.C.
 Castaway Wanderers RFC
 Wanderers Amateur Athletic Club
 HFX Wanderers FC
 Montreal Wanderers
 Montreal Wanderers RFC

Ireland
 Wanderers F.C. (rugby union), a rugby union club based in Dublin
 Ballyboden Wanderers GAA
 Bray Wanderers F.C.
 Pembroke Wanderers Hockey Club
 Wexford Wanderers RFC

New Zealand
 Cashmere Wanderers
 Hamilton Wanderers AFC
 Havelock North Wanderers AFC

United States
 Brooklyn Wanderers
 Grafton Wanderers

United Kingdom

England
 Wanderers F.C. 
 Birkenhead Wanderers 
 Bolton Wanderers F.C.
 Burton Wanderers F.C.
 Burton Park Wanderers F.C.
 Cray Wanderers F.C.
 Dorking Wanderers F.C.
 Ipswich Wanderers F.C.
 Moseley Wanderers
 Old Hill Wanderers F.C.
 Public School Wanderers
 Shropshire Wanderers F.C.
 Sudbury Wanderers F.C.
 Warstones Wanderers F.C.
 Wolverhampton Wanderers F.C.
 Wolverhampton Wanderers W.F.C.
 Woolpack Wanderers F.C.
 Wycombe Wanderers F.C.

Scotland 
 Aberdeen Wanderers RFC
 Dundee Wanderers F.C.
 Forth Wanderers F.C.
 Greenock Wanderers RFC
 Murrayfield Wanderers RFC
 Nithsdale Wanderers F.C.
 St Cuthbert Wanderers F.C.

Wales 
 Glamorgan Wanderers RFC
 Llanelli Wanderers RFC

Malta
 S.K. Victoria Wanderers F.C., Malta
 Sliema Wanderers F.C., Malta

Elsewhere
Africa:
 African Wanderers F.C., South Africa
 Arsenal Wanderers, Mauritius
 Manzini Wanderers F.C., Eswatini
 Mighty Wanderers FC, Malawi
 Mufulira Wanderers F.C., Zambia

South America 
 Montevideo Wanderers F.C., Uruguay
 Santiago Wanderers, Chile
 Scottish Wanderers Football Club, Brazil

Elsewhere 
 Wanderers Cricket Club, a cricket club in Barbados
 NS Wanderers RC, Malaysia

Other
 Georg Wilhelm Wanderer, German portrait-painter
 Wanderer (company), a German automobile manufacturer
 Wanderer (video game), 1986
 Wanderer (AROS), a user interface based on Zune widget toolkit
 The Wanderers (band), a 1981 punk band established by Stiv Bators
 The Wanderer (criminal) (1958–2018), nickname for Norwegian criminal Terje Larsen
 The Wanderer Tour, a 1981 concert tour associated with the Donna Summer album
 World Wide Web Wanderer, an early web-crawler
 Wanderers, a 1909 Knut Hamsun anthology
 Wanderer, the 1963 autobiography by Sterling Hayden
 Wanderer butterflies, certain wide-ranging brush-footed butterflies:
 Bematistes aganice, a species of tropical Africa
 Danaus plexippus (monarch), a species of the Americas
 Pareronia, a genus of tropical Asia
Wanderer above the Sea of Fog, an 1818 painting by Caspar David Friedrich
 The Peredvizhniki or Wanderers, a school of nineteenth-century Russian painters
 The Wanderers, a mysterious race in the Strugatsky brothers' Noon Universe

See also

Wander (disambiguation)
Wandering (disambiguation)
Musafir (disambiguation), Arabic word for traveller or wanderer